Plantinga is a surname. Notable people with the surname include:

 Alvin Plantinga, American analytic philosopher
 Cornelius Plantinga, president of Calvin Theological Seminary in Grand Rapids, Michigan from 2002 through 2011
 Klaas Plantinga, Dutch distiller and founder of the Plantinga Distillery in Bolsward
 Leon Plantinga, American musicologist